Marco Schällibaum (born 6 April 1962) is a Swiss football manager and former player. He is the manager of Swiss Challenge League side Yverdon-Sport FC.

Playing career 
As a player Schällibaum played 15 years in the Swiss first division from 1980 to 1995, playing in over 450 games for various top Swiss clubs and won three league titles. He also appeared in 50 Swiss Cup games, winning the Cup in 1983 with Grasshopper. He also played for the Swiss national football team from 1983 to 1988, making 31 appearances.

Managerial career

Early career 
After his career, he worked as an assistant coach at FC Basel. In 1999, he became head coach of BSC Young Boys, with whom he led the 2001 resurgence in the National League A and 2002 in the UEFA Cup. For the 2003–04 season he was coach at Servette Geneva. Later he was the coach at Concordia Basel. In November 2006, he coached FC Sion, but was released in the same month. On 2 April 2007, he signed a contract with the then relegation-threatened FC Schaffhausen. He could not prevent the descent, he remained coach at FC Schaffhausen in the Challenge League. On 28 April 2008, it was announced that he would leave at the end of Schaffhausen 2008–09 season. On 6 June 2008, however, it was announced that he would immediately leave FC Schaffhausen and join AC Bellinzona. On 1 November 2009 he was terminated by Bellinzona FC after a 0–5 home defeat against FC St. Gallen. On 17 May 2010, Marco Schällibaum took over as interim coach at FC Lugano for the Axpo Super League season 2009–10. Following the season Lugano extended his contract for the 2010–11 season.
 After leaving FC Lugano he was hired as a FIFA coaching instructor in Qatar, Mongolia and South Korea.

Montreal Impact 

On 7 January 2013 Schällibaum was named as head coach of Major League Soccer club Montreal Impact, helping the team make the MLS playoffs in only its second season in the league.  A late season collapse that saw the team limp into the post season after challenging for the Supporter's Shield (the best record in the league ) at some points during the season saw Schallibaum sacked on 18 December 2013. Schällibaum was suspended four times during the season.

Return to Switzerland
On 22 April 2022, Schällibaum was hired by Bellinzona in the Swiss third-tier Swiss Promotion League. He left the club at the end of the season after achieving promotion to the second tier.

On 13 June 2022, he signed with Yverdon-Sport.

Coaching record

Honors

Manager
Montreal Impact
Walt Disney World Pro Soccer Classic (1): 2013
Canadian Championship (1): 2013

References

External links
Marco Schällibaum at Eurosport Australia
Marco Schällibaum at Goal.com

Marco Schällibaum at SoccerPunter.com

1962 births
Living people
Association football fullbacks
Swiss men's footballers
Swiss football managers
Switzerland international footballers
Grasshopper Club Zürich players
FC Basel players
Servette FC players
FC Luzern players
FC Basel managers
BSC Young Boys managers
Servette FC managers
FC Sion managers
AC Bellinzona managers
FC Schaffhausen managers
CF Montréal coaches
Major League Soccer coaches
FC Lugano managers
FC Concordia Basel managers
FC Stade Nyonnais managers
Yverdon-Sport FC managers
Footballers from Zürich